Zeylanechinorhynchus is a monotypic genus of worms belonging to the family Neoechinorhynchidae. The only species is Zeylanechinorhynchus longinuchalis.

The species is found in Ceylon.

References

Neoechinorhynchidae
Acanthocephala genera